The 2002 Toledo Rockets football team represented the University of Toledo during the 2002 NCAA Division I-A football season. They competed as a member of the Mid-American Conference (MAC) in the West Division. The Rockets were led by head coach Tom Amstutz.

Schedule

Roster

Team players in the NFL

References

Toledo
Toledo Rockets football seasons
Toledo Rockets football